TAC stands for tetracaine, adrenaline, and cocaine, it was introduced by Pryor et al. in 1980. TAC is a topical anesthetic solution for local anesthesia and is recommended for use on pediatric patients.

Due to drug diversion concerns surrounding the use of cocaine in medicine, along with concern regarding toxicity and expense, the cocaine was replaced with lidocaine and a new anesthetic was created - lidocaine, epinephrine, and tetracaine (LET).

References

External links

Local anesthetics